The valley station is the lower terminal of an aerial lift, cable car, gondola lift, chairlift, rack railway or ski lift. The valley station is the counterpart of a top station. Cable cars may be boarded at both stations. The valley station is always at a lower elevation than the top station.

Valley stations on a cable car may be ordinary buildings with a docking bay or open steel structures. They are oriented in the direction of the cables. Gondola lifts, by contrast always have horizontally-oriented valley stations.

Gallery

Examples

External links 

Aerial lifts
Ski lifts
Funicular railways
Rack railways